Salim Kipsang (born 22 December 1979) is a Kenyan long-distance runner, who specializes in the 10,000 metres and marathon.

Life
Kipsang was born in 1979. Both he and his brother are runners. His brother Henry is married to the road runner Diana Sigei Chepkemoi.

Kipsang won a silver medal over 10,000 m at the 1998 World Junior Championships in Annecy. Moving on to cross country running, he claimed victory at the 2000 edition of the Cross de Soria in Spain. He competed in 10,000 m at the 2003 World Championships in Paris without finishing the race.

Among his first successes on the road was a win at the Grand Prix von Bern 10-miler in 2002. He won the Paris Marathon in 2005 with a time of 2:08:04. Kipsang was the 2006 winner of the 20 van Alphen race. He finished third at the 2007 Berlin Marathon, setting a personal best of 2:07:29 hours, and won the 2009 Tokyo Marathon. He returned to Tokyo in both 2010 and 2011 but managed only ninth and eighth place, respectively. He returned to the marathon podium in Japan at the inaugural edition of the Osaka Marathon in October 2011, placing third in a time of 2:14:18 hours.

Achievements
All results regarding marathon, unless stated otherwise

References

External links

Marathoninfo profile

1979 births
Living people
Kenyan male long-distance runners
Kenyan male marathon runners
Paris Marathon male winners
Tokyo Marathon male winners